This is a list of heads of the Bosnian-Podrinje Canton Goražde.

Heads of the Bosnian-Podrinje Canton Goražde (1996–present)

 New Beginning (NP)

Governors

Prime Ministers

External links
World Statesmen - Bosnian-Podrinje Canton Goražde

Bosnian Podrinje Canton